A by-election was held for the New South Wales Legislative Assembly electorate of The Tumut on 26 September 1861 because Charles Cowper Jr., the son of then Premier Charles Cowper had been appointed Clerk of the Executive Council in the third Cowper ministry. Such ministerial by-elections were usually uncontested.

Dates

Result

Charles Cowper Jr. had been appointed Clerk of the Executive Council in the third Cowper ministry.

See also
Electoral results for the district of Tumut
List of New South Wales state by-elections

References

1861 elections in Australia
New South Wales state by-elections
1860s in New South Wales